3JS is a Dutch band from Volendam, currently consisting of Jan Dulles, Jaap Kwakman and Robin Küller. The band rose to fame in 2007 after the success of their debut album Watermensen, which they had recorded with their friends Jan Smit and Nick & Simon. In 2011, the band represented the Netherlands in the Eurovision Song Contest 2011 with the song "Never Alone".

History 
The name "3JS" is based on the first names of the band's original members: Jan Dulles, Jaap Kwakman and Jaap de Witte. The three original members have known each other since 1996. From 2002 they performed locally under their current name, 3JS.

2007–2008: Watermensen 
On 8 June 2007, the band released its first studio album, Watermensen. The album was recorded entirely in-house. All compositions are self made and the production took them for its own account. The album brought the modest hits "Kom", "Net alsof", "Een met de bomen", "Watermensen" and "Wiegelied". On 6 July 2007, the album reached number six in the Mega Album Top 100 and lasted 87 weeks in the top 100.

In the summer of 2007, a television programme under the name 3JS komen eraan about the band aired on the local channel, RTV Noord-Holland for eight weeks. The programme starred Jan Smit, with the band members regular guests on the programme.

On 21 January 2008, the band along with Alain Clark, Wouter Hamel, Nick & Simon and Thomas Berge were given an original Rembrandt. This prize is awarded by Stichting Nederlandse Muziek, for songs that are distinguished by lyrics and original compositions. A day later they won the 2007 Zilveren Harp. Both awards were won for their debut album Watermensen.

2008–2010: Kamers van m'n hart and Dromers en dwazen 
In October 2008, the group released their second album, Kamers van m'n hart. The first single, "Hou van mij", was a top 10 hit, which reached number four in the Single Top 100. The album was as well received as its predecessor, with the album reaching number 4 in its first week on the Mega Album Top 100, and lasting forty weeks in the charts.

The third album by 3JS, entitled Dromers en dwazen was released in the spring of 2010. The group will release their first single from the album, "Loop met me over zee", on 27 October 2010.

2011: Eurovision Song Contest 
During a radio show, the band announced that they were the Netherlands representative at the Eurovision Song Contest 2011 in Germany, with the Dutch broadcaster, Televisie Radio Omroep Stichting (TROS) also announcing the bands candidacy. With the band saying: "It's about the song again", after the Dutch poor results in recent years. The band produced five songs before the end 2010, which were performed at the national final (Nationaal Songfestival) in early 2011, during which the public and a professional jury voted for their favourite song.

At the Eurovision Song Contest, the band took last place in the semi-final with only 13 points in total.

2012–present 
In 2013, Jaap de Witte announced that he would leave the band. He was replaced by his son Jan de Witte. In 2019, the band announced that Jan de Witte would leave the band. He was replaced by Robin Johannes Küller.

Timeline

Discography

Albums

Singles

References

External links 
3js.nl

Musical groups from North Holland
Eurovision Song Contest entrants for the Netherlands
Eurovision Song Contest entrants of 2011